Chelsea Heights is a suburb in Melbourne, Victoria, Australia, 30 km south-east of Melbourne's Central Business District, located within the City of Kingston local government area.

The suburb is home to Chelsea Heights Primary School, The Chelsea Heights Cricket & Football Club and the Bonbeach Blue Jays Baseball Club.

On the border of Chelsea Heights and Chelsea is the Bayside Trail bicycle track, which begins in Seaford and continues north for approximately 43 km to Port Melbourne.

History

Prior to the 1870s, Chelsea Heights was known as the Isles of Wannarkladdin, being the only high land of the Carrum Carrum Swamp.

Popular reference

The aerial photography at the beginning of the Network 7 show Kath & Kim shows the central portion of Chelsea Heights.

See also
 City of Springvale – Chelsea Heights was previously within this former local government area.

References

External links

Australian Places: Chelsea Heights

Suburbs of Melbourne
Suburbs of the City of Kingston (Victoria)